The 2009 Oceania Women's Handball Championship was the fourth edition of the Oceania Handball Nations Cup, which took place in Brisbane, Australia from 25 to 30 May 2009. Australia won the right represent Oceania in the World Cup.

Standings

Results
All times are local (UTC+10).

References

Australian Women's Handball Squad Steps Up Preparation for World Championship Qualifyer. NY Hockey Online. 20 March 2009
Australian Women's Team Participating in Pacific Cup. NY Hockey Online. 19 May 2009

External links
Results on todor66.com
NZHF report

Oceania Women championship
Oceania Handball Championship
1997 Oceania Women's Handball Champions Cup
Women's handball in Australia
2009 in Australian sport
May 2009 sports events in Australia